The Bong Connection is a 2006 Bengali-
English language Indian film starring Raima Sen, Shayan Munshi and Parambrata Chatterjee and directed by Anjan Dutt. The movie is based on the lives of Bengalis in the U.S. and Kolkata.

Plot
The story revolves around two young men, Apu (Parambrata Chatterjee) and Andy (Shayan Munshi). Apu is leaving for US. He promises his girlfriend, Sheela (Raima Sen) that he will come back soon and take her to the US.

Andy, a second-generation Bengali born and brought up in New York City, has dreams of becoming a musician and working in films. He comes to Kolkata to pursue his passion and stays at the house of his paternal uncle and grandfather. In Kolkata he meets Sheela, befriends her and falls in love with her.

Meanwhile, Apu, arrives in the US and struggles to find his way in an alien nation. In the process he befriends Rita (played by Peeya Rai Chowdhary) whose parents want to get her married to Apu. The rest of the movie revolves around the socio-comic adventures of Apu and Andy as they struggle to find their calling in life.

The movie featured an appearance by Kolkata alt-rock band Cassini's Division.

Cast
Shayan Munshi as Andy
Parambrata Chatterjee as Apu
Raima Sen as Sheela
Peeya Rai Chowdhary as Rita
Victor Banerjee
Soumitra Chatterjee
Mamata Shankar
Biswajit Chakraborty
Avijit Dutt
Saswata Chatterjee
Samrat Chakrabarti
Shauvik Kundagrami
Mir Afsar Ali
June Malia

Reception
Khalid Mohamed of Hindustan Times gave the film two out of five stars, writing, "Quite a guzzle puzzle, this". Rajeev Masand gave it the same rating and concluded, "it’s not entirely unwatchable, but it’s not a film you’re going to remember even five minutes after you’ve left the cinema." The Times of India, however, was highly positive of the film, writing, "It’s a delightful canvas of introspective comment which captures the psyche of the young Bengalis, even as it brings forth stirring performances by all the characters."

Sequel

References

External links
 

2006 films
2006 drama films
Films about Indian Americans
English-language Indian films
Films set in Houston
Films set in Kolkata
Films set in New York (state)
Films shot in Houston
Bengali-language Indian films
Films directed by Anjan Dutt
2000s Bengali-language films